Theophilus Nash Buckingham (May 31, 1880 – March 10, 1971), commonly referred to as Nash Buckingham, was an American author and conservationist from Tennessee.  He wrote a collection of short stories entitled De Shootinest Gent'man.

He played college football for the Tennessee Volunteers, where he was captain and selected an All-Southern tackle in 1902.  For many years after, Buckingham selected the All-Southern team for the Memphis Commercial Appeal. He was nominated though not selected for an Associated Press All-Time Southeast 1869-1919 era team.

Buckingham wrote nine books and hundreds of articles that regularly appeared in such magazines as Outdoor Life, Field & Stream, and Sports Afield and Recreation. His writings were often accompanied by photographs taken by the author himself.

An avid shotgunner and wing shot, Buckingham was considered an authority on topics relating to waterfowl and upland birds, as well as the methods and tools used to hunt them. Although Buckingham pursued a variety of game in his lifetime, if his own writing is a true indication, it would seem that "Mr. Buck" possessed a special fondness for ducks and quail. He was active in a number of outdoor related activities such as Field Judging and a dedicated and influential participant in a number of worthy causes devoted to the betterment of hunting, sporting literature and the preservation of the American outdoor tradition.  As such, Buckingham was given a number of prestigious awards for having used his voice to help the cause of conservation.  He spoke out often and eloquently about the necessity of enforcing game laws and was a staunch advocate of the Migratory Bird Treaty Act of 1918.

References

1880 births
1971 deaths
All-Southern college football players
American conservationists
American football fullbacks
American football tackles
American hunters
American short story writers
Tennessee Volunteers football players